Bidens conjuncta, the bog beggarticks, is a species of flowering plant in the family Asteraceae. It belongs to the genus Bidens, collectively called kokoʻolau or koʻokoʻolau in the Hawaiian language. Bidens conjuncta is found only on western Maui.

Its natural habitat are wet forests and bogs. It is threatened by habitat loss due to the spread of invasive weeds and brush fires.

References

conjuncta
Endemic flora of Hawaii
Biota of Maui
Plants described in 1923
Taxonomy articles created by Polbot